Miss Latina Australia 2016 was an Australian national beauty pageant run by E & E Events Management. It took place on July 23, 2016, in the historical Regent Ballroom in Northcote, Victoria. 12 finalists participated in the gala event. At the conclusion of the final event Georgette Psarreas (Chilean & Greek) was crowned Miss Latina Australia with Daniella Seoane (Uruguayan) second place and Miss charity. Jessica Bustamante (El Salvadorian)  won title of people's choice, Tatiana Castiblanco (Colombian) winning Miss Photogenic. Miss América Latina international beauty contest was chosen for Georgette Psarreas to represent Australia and was flown all expenses paid to the Occidental Xcaret Resort in Mexico.

History 

Miss Latina Australia beauty pageant was first held at the Golden Star Receptions in Epping, Victoria on June 13, 2015 and designed for women of Latina descent who are Australian permanent residents or citizens. The Miss América Latina international beauty contest was chosen for the winner of the 2016 Australian pageant to be a part of. Eva Giollo in 2015 was the first title holder and delegate for Australia on the international stage. The Miss Latina Australia pageant has received extensive coverage through National Spanish newspapers such as the Latin Australian Times and El Español and is a highlight for the Spanish speaking community in Australia.

Charity 

Estela Tapia is the National Director of Miss Latina Australia pageant which supports the “Hogar Maria Auxiliadora” Orphanage in Cochabamba Bolivia. Several of the Finalists fundraise for this cause, and the most successful fundraiser receives the Miss Latina Australia Charity Award, this year it was Uruguayan born Daniella Seoane

Results

See also
 List of beauty contests
 Miss Latina Australia
 Miss Lindeza 2017

References

External links
Official website

2016 beauty pageants
2016
Beauty pageants for people of specific ethnic or national descents